Duravino is a rural locality (a village) in Nikolotorzhskoye Rural Settlement, Kirillovsky District, Vologda Oblast, Russia. The population was 10 as of 2002.

Geography 
Duravino is located 33 km southeast of Kirillov (the district's administrative centre) by road. Ustye-Sitskoye is the nearest rural locality.

References 

Rural localities in Kirillovsky District